François Vincent (born 10 April 1936) is a French weightlifter. He competed in the men's middle heavyweight event at the 1960 Summer Olympics.

References

1936 births
Living people
French male weightlifters
Olympic weightlifters of France
Weightlifters at the 1960 Summer Olympics
Sportspeople from Montpellier